The Theban Tomb TT178 is located in El-Khokha, part of the Theban Necropolis, on the west bank of the Nile, opposite to Luxor.

TT178 was the burial place of the ancient Egyptian named Neferronpet called Kenro, who was a scribe of the treasury in the estate of Amun-Re. Neferronpet called Kenro lived during the reign of  Ramesses II during the  Nineteenth Dynasty of Egypt. He had a wife named Mutemwia. In the inner room Neferronpet called Kenro is said to be the son of a man named Piay. Four seated statues include those of the priest of Amun named Piay and a woman named Wiay (his mother?)

The tomb
The tomb consists of a hall and an inner room. The hall contains scenes depicting Kenro and his wife adoring. They are shown censing and libating before offerings made to Amenhotep I and Ahmose Nefertari. In another scene Kenro and his wife Mutemwia are shown playing the game senet while a harpist sings before them. A man named Bakenwer, who was a priest and lector of Ptah is shown offering incense, bread and beer to Kenro and his wife, while in another scene is he shown offering a bouquet to Kenro.

The funerary procession depicted in the hall shows and names several men. They include a man named Ray, one named Panehesy and a man named Huy, who is described as his (Kenro's) brother. The person offering the libations is named Pre-rekh, while the lector priest is named Amenemone.

In the inner room treasury scribes Bakamun and Nai are shown kneeling and libating before Kenro and his wife Mutemwia. An offering list detailing some 36 items in included on the walls of the inner chamber. The offerings range from bread and cakes to beer and wine. The treasury scribe Khaemope is shown in another scene offering to Kenro and his wife as the couple is seated in a kiosk. Pre-rekh and Bakenwer, who were shown in the hall, also appear in offering scenes in the inner room. Pre-rekh is described as his friend.

A text in the inner room identifies Kenro's father as a man named Piay. A priest of Amun named Piay also appears as one of the seated statues in a niche in the inner room. The other statues depict Kenro, his wife Mutemwia, and a woman named Wiay.

See also
 List of Theban tombs

References

Theban tombs
Nineteenth Dynasty of Egypt